Hayle Kimbro Pool (Cornish: Hal Kembro, meaning "Welshman's marsh") is a wetland on The Lizard, Cornwall.

The wetland site consists of three shallow ponds with a combined winter surface area of 23,000 square metres. It forms part of the West Lizard Site of Special Scientific Interest.

The aquatic plant communities at the site are typified by Common Spike-rush, Common Cottongrass, Water Mint and Marsh Pennywort.

Hayle Kimbro Pool hosted Britain's first Scarlet Dragonfly in 1995 and was also the first site at which breeding evidence for the Lesser Emperor was detected, in 1999

References

Wetlands of England
Environment of Cornwall
Nature Conservation Review sites